Limnosciadium is a genus of flowering plants belonging to the family Apiaceae.

Its native range is Central USA to Alabama.

Species:
 Limnosciadium pinnatum (DC.) Mathias & Constance

References

Apioideae
Apioideae genera